Macruromys is a genus of rodent in the family Muridae endemic to New Guinea.
It contains the following species:
 Lesser small-toothed rat (M. elegans)
 Eastern small-toothed rat (M. major)

References

 
Rodent genera
Taxonomy articles created by Polbot
Endemic fauna of New Guinea
Rodents of New Guinea